Anisopogon is a genus of Australian plants in the grass family. 
The only known species is Anisopogon avenaceus, native to Victoria and New South Wales. It is known commonly as oat speargrass. It is a perennial grass growing up to 1.5 metres tall, bearing spikelets up to 6 centimetres long.

See also 
 List of Poaceae genera

References 

Pooideae
Endemic flora of Australia
Monotypic Poaceae genera